Justin Haak (born September 12, 2001) is an American professional soccer player who plays as a defensive midfielder for Major League Soccer club New York City FC.

Early life
Haak attended Tompkins Square Middle School in Lower East Side from 2012 to 2015
Haak attended High School for Environmental Studies in New York City from 2015 to 2019. While attending he played for NYCFC's Academy.

Professional career
On January 24, 2019, Haak signed as a Homegrown Player with Major League Soccer side New York City FC.

Haak made his professional debut on June 4, 2019, appearing as an 86th-minute substitute during a 5–2 win against FC Cincinnati.

On September 9, 2020, Haak joined USL Championship side Hartford Athletic on loan from New York City for the rest of the 2020 season.  On September 17, Haak scored his first professional goal in Hartford's 3–1 victory over New York Red Bulls II.

On August 16, 2021, Haak rejoined Hartford Athletic on loan for the remainder of their 2021 season.

Following the 2022 season, Haak's contract with NYCFC expired, but he re-signed with the club ahead of the 2023 season.

Career statistics

Club

Honors
New York City FC
Campeones Cup: 2022

References

External links

nycfc.com Justin Haak at New York City FC

2001 births
Living people
American soccer players
Association football midfielders
Homegrown Players (MLS)
Major League Soccer players
New York City FC players
Hartford Athletic players
People from Brooklyn
Soccer players from New York (state)
United States men's youth international soccer players
USL Championship players
New York City FC II players
MLS Next Pro players